Canelo is an independent British publisher which launched in 2015. The three founding partners are Iain Millar, Michael Bhaskar and Nick Barreto.

Bhaskar told The Guardian that the corporate goal is to bring the tools of traditional publishing: proofreading, editing, and working closely with authors together with improved design of the digital page to publish both fiction and non-fiction e-books.   
The new venture's chosen name, "Canelo", loosely translates as the Spanish word for cinnamon.

Bhaskar is former digital publishing director at Profile Books and author of The Content Machine, a history of publishing. According to British Airways' Business Life magazine, The Content Machine explains that the role of a publisher is: "to filter (curate the best), frame (choose the format) and amplify (spread the news about) content."

References

External links
Official site

Book publishing companies of the United Kingdom
2015 establishments in the United Kingdom